This Is a Recording contains demos from the years 1994–1997. It is out of print, and Kevin Moore has publicly said that there will be no reprint.

Track listing
All music and lyrics by Kevin Moore, except "The Fucking Mouse" lyrics by Todd Farrington.

Song information
"Hay Day. May Day. Help", "Roll Away The Stone", "Nora", "Shallow" and "Hollow" are the remastered versions of songs previously released on Moore's demo tape titled Music Meant to Be Heard, which was distributed through Dream Theater fan clubs in 1995. "Hay Day. May Day. Help" was titled "Normal Words" on the original demo.

"Wednesday The Sky" is musically an early version of the song "S.O.S" from Chroma Key's first album Dead Air for Radios, although lyrically it's completely different.

"On The Page" (Track 6), "S.O.S" and "The Fucking Mouse" are the early versions of the songs (the latter being re-titled to "Mouse (Now Watch What Happens)") from Dead Air for Radios. "On The Page" (Track 13), "Watercolor" and "Chromakey" were recorded as Chroma Key in 1995, the latter two songs not making to the final version of Dead Air for Radios.

"Squelch", "Blusong" and "Because The Plane Crashed" appear only on This Is a Recording. "Because The Plane Crashed" is linked to "The Fucking Mouse" by the answering machine recording samples.

Personnel
 Kevin Moore – keyboards, programming, bass, vocals, production
 Rich Kern – guitar on tracks 2, 4, 5, 11, 12
 Greg Cathcart – guitar on track 14
 Mark Zonder – drums on tracks 13-15
 Björk – sampled vocals on track 11
 Steve Tushar – mastering

References

1999 albums